Filyayevo is a rural locality (a village) in Kadnikov, Sokolsky District, Vologda Oblast, Russia. The population was 29 as of 2002.

Geography 
By road, Filyayevo is located 25 km northeast of Sokol, the district's administrative centre. Kadnikov is the nearest rural locality.

References 

Rural localities in Sokolsky District, Vologda Oblast